Monte Altissimo is a mountain in the  Bergamasque Prealps, with a height of .

It is located between the lower Val Camonica, the lower Val di Scalve. The Borno plateau divides it from the higher Pizzo Camino. Nearby is the Oglio River.

References

Mountains of Lombardy
Mountains of the Alps